The 1999–2000 season was the 49th season in the existence of Córdoba CF and the club's first season back in the second division of Spanish football since 1983.

Competitions

Overall record

La Liga

League table

Results summary

Results by round

Matches

Source:

Copa del Rey

Preliminary round

First round

References

Córdoba CF seasons
Córdoba